

Peerage of England

|Earl of Kent (1067)||Odo of Bayeux||1067||1088||Forfeit
|-
|Earl of Cornwall (1068)||Robert, Count of Mortain||1068||1095|| 
|-
|Earl of Dorset (1070)||Osmund, Count of Seez||1070||1099|| 
|-
|Earl of Chester (1071)||Hugh d'Avranches, 1st Earl of Chester||1071||1101|| 
|-
|Earl of Shrewsbury (1074)||Roger de Montgomerie, 1st Earl of Shrewsbury||1074||1094|| 
|-
|Earl of Northampton (1080)||Simon I de Senlis, Earl of Huntingdon-Northampton||1080||1109||New creation
|-
|Earl of Albemarle (1081)||Adelaide, 1st Countess of Albemarle||1081||1090||New creation
|-
|Earl of Surrey (1088)||William de Warenne, 1st Earl of Surrey||1088||1099||New creation
|-
|Earl of Warwick (1088)||Henry de Beaumont, 1st Earl of Warwick||1088||1119||New creation

References

Lists of peers by decade
1080s in England
 
Peers